Martin 'Marty' Hanson (2 July 1923 – 20 February 1976) was an Australian politician. He was the Labor member for Port Curtis in the Legislative Assembly of Queensland from 1963 to 1976.

References

1923 births
1976 deaths
Members of the Queensland Legislative Assembly
Place of birth missing
Australian Labor Party members of the Parliament of Queensland
20th-century Australian politicians